The Pathfinder Platoon is a pathfinder unit of the British Army, and an integral part of 16 Air Assault Brigade. The Pathfinder Platoon acts as the brigade's advance force and reconnaissance force. Its role includes locating and marking drop zones and helicopter landing zones for air landing operations. Once the main force has landed, the platoon provides tactical intelligence and offensive action roles for the brigade.

History
During the Second World War small groups of parachute soldiers were formed into pathfinder units, to parachute ahead of the main force. Their tasks were to mark the drop zones (DZ) or landing zones (LZ), set up radio beacons as a guide for the aircraft carrying the main force and to clear and protect the area as the main force arrive.

The units were formed into two companies to work with the two airborne divisions.  The 21st Independent Parachute Company served with the 1st Airborne Division and the 22nd Independent Parachute Company served with the 6th Airborne Division. The 22nd Independent Parachute Company were amongst the lead elements of the 6th Airborne division's drop into Normandy as part of Operation Tonga; the 21st Independent Parachute Company took part in Operation Market Garden landing at Arnhem in September 1944. After marking the DZs and LSs The Company was trapped with the rest of the division in the Oosterbeek Perimeter.

After the war both companies were disbanded and in 1948, the army's parachute force was reduced to the 16 Parachute Brigade. Part of this reduction saw the formation of the No. 1 Guards Independent Parachute Company which became the pathfinder unit for the newly formed brigade.  The Company deployed on a wide variety of operations between 1948 and 1977. It was deployed to Borneo  during the Borneo Confrontation where it was trained as a special reconnaissance unit.

Following the 1982 Falklands War, 5 Airborne Brigade was established as a light, rapid reaction force for similar requirements.  The brigade was formed from the two Parachute Regiment and one line infantry battalions and support units. The Brigade identified a requirement for an independent intelligence collection capability, deployable into a hostile or non-permissive environment ahead of the main force so in 1985 the Pathfinder Platoon was established with personnel drawn initially from the patrols platoon of each of the three Parachute Battalions. For many years it was not an officially established unit, being financed from other parts of the Brigade's budget. In 1999, 5 Airborne Brigade merged with 24 Airmobile Brigade to form the present day 16 Air Assault Brigade with the platoon remaining attached to the Brigade headquarters.

Command, control and organisation 
The platoon work under the command of the Brigade Headquarters in Colchester, Essex. The Officer Commanding Pathfinder Platoon is a senior Captain or Major with an Operations Warrant Officer (OPSWO) as his second in command.  The platoon operates in teams of between 4–6 men. In 2006 a new rate of Parachute Pay (High Altitude Parachute Pay) was introduced for members of the Pathfinder Platoon following the recommendations of the Armed Forces’ Pay Review Body.

The Pathfinder Platoon also maintains attached personnel. Soldiers can come from various units to fill a specific role, signallers, logistics, fleet management and vehicle maintenance, but are not qualified Pathfinders unless they choose to attend and are successful on selection.

Selection and training

Pre-Selection Courses
In preparation for the Selection Course, applicants would attend the a two-day Pathfinder Briefing Course (PBC) & a five-day Pathfinder Preparation Course (PFPC). The PBC is held 6 times per year, and the Pathfinder Preparation Course (PFPC) is  held 2 times per year.

Pathfinder Briefing Course
This two-day briefing course, conducted in and around Merville Barracks in Colchester, held 6 times per year, spread out throughout the year, aims to prepare potential candidates for the Selection Course. It aims to give candidates an insight of service in the Pathfinders, advice and guidance on how best to prepare for the Selection Course. During this briefing course they also conduct basic fitness and navigation exercises, along with allowing candidates the opportunity to ask any questions. 

The PBC does not contain any pass/fail tests. Its aim is to prepare candidates for the Selection course. It is mandatory for anyone  wishing to attend the Selection Course. However it does not commit an individual to attend the following selection course,. Attendance at the PFBC is valid for 18 months.

Pathfinder Preparation Course
The Preparation Course (PFPC) is a five-day course, held 2 times per year in South Wales, that run concurrently with the Pathfinder Platoon Selection Course, which is also run 2 times per year.

The PFPC aims to allow potential soldiers and officers the opportunity to gain insight into the Pathfinder, and to provide advice on how best to prepare for the Selection Course.

They also provide training environments to conduct basic fitness and hill navigation exercises.

Like the PBC, it does not contain any pass/fail tests, and like the PBC, it is mandatory for anyone wishing to attend the Selection Course. The PFPC is designed to help candidates prepare for the Selection Course, by giving advice and guidance, and the opportunity to make mistakes.

Pathfinder Platoon Selection Course
Selection lasts for 6 weeks, held 2 times per year, the Pathfinder Platoon Selection Course (PSFC), also known as 'The Cadre' covers almost all UKSF Selection Course training grounds although it is much shorter. The Cadre consist of:

Prior to Phase 1, there are two entry tests that must be passed on Day 1.

 An 8 mile CFT over unfamiliar route carrying a 44 IB (20kg, less food, water, and rifle), to be completed in two hours or less.
 The second is a 2 mile speed test carrying the same quantity as in the first test, to be completed in 18 minutes or less.

Phase 1 – Aptitude Phase (1 week)

Candidates need to complete:

 2x 8 mile (13 km) speed march
 10 mile (16 km) speed march
 2 mile (3.2 km) march in full equipment

Candidates are taught basic navigation and signal skills in between the physical exercises.

Phase 2 – Navigation Phase (1 week)

Also known as Hills Phase, candidates need to complete:

 16 mile (26 km) tab over the hills of Brecon Beacon
 15 mile (24 km) tab across Black Mountains
 40 mile (64 km) march

Phase 3 – Standard Operating Procedure (SOP) Phase (1 week)

Candidates will be trained with:

 Basic Patrol skills
 Contact drills
 Helicopter procedures
 Construction of concealed Observation post (OP)

Phase 4 – Range Phase (1 week)

Also known as Live firing Phase, this phase takes place on Sennybridge Training Area (SENTA). The candidate will be trained with:

 Focused contact drills
 Man-down drills
 Basic demolition

At the end of Phase 4, candidates will participate in a platoon-sized live assault.

Phase 5 – Final Exercise (2 weeks)

Candidates will be teaming up with a 4-6 men team and tasked with planning and execute a typical reconnaissance mission. Candidates will be captured and need to go through series of mock interrogations by the instructors. Candidates are tested physically and mentally (SERE training).

Further training
After completed the Selection Course, successful candidates would complete a short indication cadres before moving onto employment training in weapons, mobility, communications and other patrol skills. All Pathfinder qualify as high-altitude parachutist by completing a HALO/HAHO course. Pathfinders who aren't already parachute trained in basic Static line jumps would first have to complete the Basic Parachute Course, before moving onto HALO/HAHO training.

Pathfinders are also sent on SERE courses for various environments such as desert, arctic and jungle. Members also have the option of attending sniper school, joint terminal attack controllers JTAC course and advanced surveillance courses to learn photography.

Operations

The present day Pathfinder Platoon has taken part in operations in Yugoslavia, Sierra Leone, Macedonia, Afghanistan and Iraq.

In June 1999, they were part of Operation Agricola in Kosovo. The platoon provided reconnaissance and the forward air control of air assets, behind enemy lines, for NATO command several days prior to the main land offensive. Once NATO forces had entered Kosovo, the platoon were re-tasked to provide a defensive screen around Pristina International Airport prior to the arrival of the Russian forces.

Their next operation was Operation Palliser in Sierra Leone. The platoon deployed into Freetown on May 7, 2000, to assist the UNAMSIL efforts. Deployed around Lungi under the command of Sergeant Stephen Heaney, they were engaged by a Revolutionary United Front (RUF) force trying to capture the airport. The platoon, outnumbered 20 to one, fought throughout the night and repulsed the RUF, which suffered 20 dead without any loss to the platoon. For his actions during the engagement Heaney was awarded the Military Cross.

In 2001 the Pathfinder Platoon deployed for Operation Essential Harvest in the Republic of Macedonia supporting the Special Air Service in mapping the National Liberation Army (NLA) positions.

The platoon was deployed to the southern Afghan province of Helmand alongside the 3 Para Battle Group in 2006. The Pathfinders spent 52 days in the town of Musa Qal'eh and were engaged in fighting the Taliban for 26 of the 52 days.

By May 19, the Pathfinders joined the Afghan National Police (ANP) in a counterattack in Taliban-held territory. From there, a US B-1 Lancer bomber and A-10's were directed by PF forward air controllers (FACs) onto Taliban positions.  They were then supplemented by French Super Etendards from the Charles de Gaulle aircraft carrier in the Indian Ocean. The men then set out on a four-day mission to a town in the north of Helmand province in Afghanistan ended up spending 52 days under siege by the Taliban.  25 men, who have been first into several Taliban-held areas during the British deployment in southern Afghanistan, came under such ferocious attack that they were forced to stay in Musa Qala fighting almost daily battles. The group was supposed to be reinforced by a company of 120 paratroopers but they had to be diverted to the town of Sangin when they came under heavy assault by Taliban insurgents. The platoon were finally replaced in Musa Qala when 500 British troops, in a mission codenamed Operation Snakebite broke through Taliban lines.

In 2010 the Pathfinders deployed again to Helmand Afghanistan as the Brigade Reconnaissance Force operating throughout Helmand Province conducting reconnaissance tasks and offensive action tasks. During the course of this tour an attached soldier Pte John "Jack" Howard (3 Para) was killed in action during a strafing run from an American Close Air Support mission.

In 2021 Pathfinders were deployed to Kabul taking part in Operation Pitting to assist in the evacuation of British nationals as well as eligible Afghans. The Pathfinders provided security to the airfield and assisted in locating personnel unable to get to the airport. This ended the 20 years that the UK was involved militarily in Afghanistan.

In popular culture 
Books

Television
BBC News: The battle for Musa Qala
Defence of the Realm: Phantom Platoon (BBC Documentary)

See also 
Brigade Patrol Troop
Mountain Leader Training Cadre
Regimental Reconnaissance Company - US Army equivalent unit
Special Operations Regiment - Belgium
Commando Parachute Group - France
US Army Special Forces - US Training Partner
Navy Seals - US Training partner

References

Airborne units and formations of the United Kingdom
Military units and formations established in 1985
1985 establishments in the United Kingdom